Foolad Mahan Sepahan Isfahan Futsal Club was an Iranian Futsal club based in Isfahan, Iran. It was part of Foolad Mahan Sepahan Sports Club. Foolad Mahan hosted the first AFC champions league tournament during March 4–12, 2010.

History 
The club was originally known as Post Isfahan. In the 2007–08 Iranian Futsal Super League it was renamed Foolad Mahan due to change of sponsorship. They have been champions of the Iranian Futsal Super League twice, and have also won the AFC Futsal Club Championship once.

Season-by-season 
The table below chronicles the achievements of the Club in various competitions.

Honours 
National: 
 Iranian Futsal Super League:
Champions (2): 2008–09, 2009–10

Continental:
 AFC Futsal Club Championship:
Champions (1): 2010

Individual
 Best player:
  Asian Futsaler of the Year 2008 – Vahid Shamsaei
  Asian Futsaler of the Year 2010 – Mohammad Taheri
 AFC Futsal Club Championship MVP Award:
  2010 – Vahid Shamsaei
 AFC Futsal Championship MVP Award:
  2010 – Mohammad Taheri
 Iran World Cup captains:
  2008 – Vahid Shamsaei
 Top Goalscorer:
  2010 AFC Futsal Club Championship:  Vahid Shamsaei (17)
  2008–09 Iranian Futsal Super League:  Vahid Shamsaei (31)
  2009–10 Iranian Futsal Super League:  Vahid Shamsaei (34)

Statistics and records

Statistics in IPL
 Seasons in Iranian Futsal Super League: 7
 Best position in Iranian Futsal Super League: First (2008–09), (2009–10)
 Worst position in Iranian Futsal Super League: 5th (2004–05)
 Most goals scored in a season: 116 (2009–10), (2011–12)
 Most goals scored in a match: 13 - 2
 Most goals conceded in a match: 8 - 6

Statistics in AFC Futsal Club Championship
 Most goals scored in a match: 12 – 1 (1 time)
 Most goals conceded in a match: 5 – 3 (1 time)

General statistics
 All-time top scorer: ? with ? goals (All Competitions)
 All-time Most Appearances:
 Player who has won most titles:

Players

2011-12 First-team squad

Former players 
For details on former players, see :Category:Foolad Mahan FSC players.

World Cup Players 
 World Cup 2008
  Hamid Reza Abrarinia
  Vahid Shamsaei
  Javad Asghari Moghaddam
  Mohammad Hashemzadeh

Famous players 
  Hamid Reza Abrarinia
  Javad Asghari Moghaddam
  Ahmad Esmaeilpour
  Mohammad Hashemzadeh
  Mohammad Keshavarz
  Reza Nasseri
  Mostafa Nazari
  Majid Raeisi
  Vahid Shamsaei
  Mohammad Taheri
  Ciço
  Jé

See also 
 Foolad Mahan Novin Futsal Club
 Foolad Mahan Isfahan Football Club

References

External links
 Official website 1
 Official website 2
 Foolad Mahan Fan Club website

 
Futsal clubs in Iran
Sport in Isfahan
Defunct futsal clubs in Iran
2008 establishments in Iran
2012 disestablishments in Iran
Futsal clubs established in 2008
Sports clubs disestablished in 2012